"Let's Make It Last All Night" is a single by Australian rock musician, Jimmy Barnes, the second issued from his fourth studio album, Two Fires. It was released in October 1990. It reached #12 on the Australian ARIA Singles Chart.

It is included on his 1996 Barnes Hits Anthology album, and his 2014 two-disc set 30:30 Hindsight.

Track listing
Cassingle (C 10207)/ 7" single (K-10207)
 "Let's Make It Last All Night" (written by Jimmy Barnes, Desmond Child, Diane Warren)
 "Bad News" (written by Jay Williams, Jimmy Barnes, Tony Brock)

Charts
"Let's Make It Last All Night" debuted at number 51 and peaked at number 12 on the Australian singles chart.

Weekly charts

Year-end charts

References

Mushroom Records singles
1990 singles
1990 songs
Jimmy Barnes songs
Song recordings produced by Don Gehman
Songs written by Diane Warren
Songs written by Desmond Child
Songs written by Jimmy Barnes